Enarmonia is a genus of moths belonging to the subfamily Olethreutinae of the family Tortricidae.

Species
Enarmonia decor Kawabe, 1978
Enarmonia flammeata Kuznetzov, 1971
Enarmonia formosana (Scopoli, 1763)
Enarmonia major (Walsingham, 1900)
Enarmonia minuscula Kuznetzov, 1981
Enarmonia pseudonectis

See also
List of Tortricidae genera

References

External links
Tortricid.net

Tortricidae genera
Olethreutinae